Komal Thatal (born 18 September 2000) is an Indian professional footballer who plays for Jamshedpur FC  in the Indian Super League. Thatal has represented India in the U-17 FIFA World Cup in 2017.

Career
Born in Sikkim, Thatal began playing competitive football in 2011 when he joined the Namchi Sports Academy of his native state. He spent three years at the academy before being advised by his coach to attend trials for the AIFF Elite Academy and India U17 side which would play in the 2017 FIFA U-17 World Cup. After impressing the coaches, Thatal joined the academy and team.

ATK
After the U-17 World Cup, Thatal decided against joining the rest of his teammates with Indian Arrows, a development team which was to play in the I-League. Instead, Thatal joined Indian Super League side ATK for the 2017–18 season. He made his professional debut for the club on 28 January 2018 in their match against Jamshedpur. Aged just 17 years and 132 days, Thatal became the youngest footballer to play an Indian Super League match. He came on in stoppage time towards the end of the match as ATK were defeated 1–0. Thatal made only two appearances for ATK in the entire season.

ATK retained Thatal for the following 2018–19 season. He made his first start for ATK on their opening fixture of the season against Delhi Dynamos which ATK won 1–2. On 31 October 2018, Thatal scored his first goal for ATK in the 15th minute against Bengaluru. However, ATK lost the game 1–2.

ATK Mohun Bagan
After the merger of ATK and Mohun Bagan AC, Thatal signed a two year contract on a permanent deal basis. He made his debut for the club on 21 January 2021 at the 89th minute in their league match against Chennaiyin FC, winning 1–0.

Jamshedpur FC 
On 20 August 2021, it was announced that Thatal has signed a 3-year contract with Jamshedpur FC. He scored his first goal on 9 December against Mumbai City FC in their 4–2 defeat.

International
After passing the trials in 2014, Thatal joined the India U17 side which was to play in the 2017 FIFA U-17 World Cup in India. On 21 September 2017, Thatal was announced as part of the final 21-man squad for the U-17 World Cup. Thatal played in India's first match in the World Cup against the United States but was not included in the squad for India's final two matches in the tournament.

He has also played for the India U-23 and U-20 teams respectively. He represented India in the Asian Cup U23 Qualifiers.

Career statistics

Honours
ATK
 Indian Super League: 2019–20

References

External links 
Komal Thatal at the-aiff.com
 Komal Thatal at Indian Super League

2000 births
Living people
Footballers from Sikkim
Indian Gorkhas
Indian footballers
AIFF Elite Academy players
ATK (football club) players
Association football midfielders
Indian Super League players
India youth international footballers
ATK Mohun Bagan FC players
Jamshedpur FC players